The Cordillera Real (also Cordillera of Quito, Cordillera Central of Ecuador) is a chain of mountains in the Andes of Ecuador, the largest of them volcanic. They are continued by the Cordillera Central of Peru to the south and the Cordillera Central of Colombia to the north. The Cordillera Real includes Antisana, Cotopaxi, and Cayambe, while Chimborazo is in the Cordillera Occidental.

See also
 Cordillera Occidental (Ecuador)
 Cordillera Central (disambiguation)

Mountain ranges of the Andes
Real